Victor Martin may refer to:
 Victor Martin (sociologist), Belgian sociologist and member of the Belgian Resistance
 Victor Martin (politician), Canadian politician
 Víctor Martín (swimmer), Spanish swimmer
 Víctor Martín (violinist), Spanish violinist